The Spine-tufted skimmer, or brown-backed red marsh hawk, (Orthetrum chrysis) is a species of dragonfly in the family Libellulidae. It is widespread in many Asian countries.

Description and habitat
It is a medium sized dragonfly with dark thorax and blood-red abdomen. It looks very similar to Orthetrum pruinosum in shape and size; but can be distinguished by the color of the abdomen. The abdomen of the female is ochreous brown. It breeds in pools and marshes.

See also 
 List of odonates of Sri Lanka
 List of odonates of India
 List of odonata of Kerala

References

 chrysis.html World Dragonflies
 Animal diversity web
 Query Results
 Sri Lanka Biodiversity
 NCBI

Libellulidae
Insects described in 1891